Event relationship graphs (ERGs) are a type of directed graph (with labeled and annotated vertices and annotated edges) used for modeling discrete-event systems. Like Petri Nets, ERGs provide a model for concurrent computation. ERGs have the full power of Turing machines.

References

Further reading
 Schruben, L. (2007), Modeling Causality with Event Relationship Graphs, in Fishwick, P.A (2007), Handbook of Dynamic System Modeling, pp. 23–1—23–21.

Systems theory